Saint Paraskeva of the Balkans was an ascetic female saint of the 10th century.

Biography

Paraskeva was born in the town of Epivates (close to present-day Istanbul) on the shore of the Sea of Marmara. Her parents were wealthy landowners.

Legend says that as a child, Paraskeva heard in a church the Lord's words: "Whoever wants to come after Me, let him deny himself, and take up his cross, and follow Me." (Mark 8, 34). These words would determine her to give her rich clothes away to the poor and to flee to Constantinople.  Her parents, who did not support her decision to follow an ascetic, religious life, looked for her in various cities.  Paraskeva fled to Chalcedon in Asia Minor, and afterwards lived at the church of the Most Holy Theotokos in Heraclea Pontica in Bithynia.  She led an austere life, experiencing visions of the Virgin Mary. Her travels took her to Jerusalem; she wished to spend the rest of her life there. After seeing Jerusalem, she settled in a convent in the desert near the River Jordan.

When she was 25, an angel appeared, telling her to return to her homeland.  She returned to Constantinople, and then, aged 25, lived in the village of Kallikrateia, in the church of the Holy Apostles. She died at the age of 27.

Local church-building 
A church dedicated to her was built in Epivates (present-day Selimpaşa) on the spot where her house of birth once stood. The oldest testimony regarding the church - written by the Russian traveller Anthony of Novgorod (who later became Archbishop of Novgorod) - dates back to the early-13th century. In August 1817 a great fire completely destroyed the church; it was rebuilt in 1820 with the financial support of the citizens of Constantinople and of the former Prince of Moldo-Wallahia, Alexander Kallimachi. In 1885 the Community demolished the old church in order to construct a much bigger one on the same site. The building, completed after 6 years, re-used parts of the 1327–1341 Byzantine tower of Duke Alexis Apokaukos as building material. It was the biggest church in the whole of Eastern Thrace (16 m in height, 26 m in width and 30 m in length), a real jewel that could be seen from kilometres away. It was completely demolished in the spring of 1979; a park occupies the site.

Veneration
Christian tradition states that after an old sinner was buried near Paraskeva’s grave, the saint protested by appearing in a dream to a local monk.  The vision informed the monk where the saint had been buried; when the body was unearthed, it was found to be incorrupt.  The relics were translated to the church of the Holy Apostles in Kallikrateia.

The cult of Saint Parascheva spread in the 14th century from Bulgaria northwards into the Romanian principalities, Wallachia and Moldavia. In this period, Bishop Evtimiy of Tarnovo (1332-1402) wrote  the biography of Saint Parascheva - "Hagiography of Saint Petka of Tarnovo”. The bishop's work was inspired from the Greek Bios of deacon Basilikos, written in the year 1150 by request of Constantinople Patriarch Nicholas IV Mouzelon.

Sometimes, Saint Parascheva of Thrace(St.Petka) is named The New. There are two other saints with her name, Saint Paraskevi of Rome (2nd century) and Saint Paraskevi of Iconium.

Some scholars wrote that there could be According to some scholars, siome overlappings between these three saints. Also, confusion might have occurred with some folk tales characters.    
Paraskeva’s cult and attributes became confused with that of other saints with the same name as well as pre-Christian deities of the Slavs.

This confusion was made because the Greek name of St Parascheva was “paraskevi”, meaning “Friday”.  The translation in languages as Romanian or Serbian was “Sfânta Vineri” or “Sveta Petka” meaning Saint Friday. 
The translation from Greek language to Romanian, Serbian or Bulgarian language was sometimes misunderstood by some scholars who connected the translated name of Saint Parascheva, Saint Friday, with a certain character from folk tales having a similar name.

As one scholar asks:

Was Parasceve, or Paraskeva, an early Christian maiden named in honor of the day of the Crucifixion?  Or was she a personification of that day, pictured cross in hand to assist the fervor of the faithful?  And was the Paraskeva of the South Slavs the same who made her appearance in northern Russia?

The answer is that there is a complete separation between the 10th-century Christian Saint Parascheva The New (called "of the Balkans") and the folk character mentioned above, derived perhaps from  pre-Christian mystical beliefs. 
The separation is made by rich biography and iconography transferred from the 10th century to 21st, all this information and studies being connected to a real person who lived in that period.

Hagiographies of Saint Parascheva (Petka) were written by: deacon Basilikos in 1150, bishop Evtimiy of Tarnovo in ca. 1385, metropolitan Matei of Mira in 1605, metropolitan Varlaam of Moldova in 1643, Saint Nikodimos the Athonite (19th century), Romanian Bishop Melchisedec of Roman in 1889.

The cults of Paraskevi of Iconium (Paraskeva-Pyatnitsa) and Paraskeva of the Balkans were conflated with that of a Slavic deity associated with Friday, alternatively known as Petka, Pyatnitsa, or Zhiva.  
Attributes, such as the association with spinning, were also merged into the cult of these saints.

Any confusion was clarified after Romanian Orthodox Church decided on 28 February 1950 to generalise the cult of Saint Parascheva The New.  
The generalisation of the cult was celebrated on 14 October 1955 in Iasi Cathedral with the presence of high rank clerics from Bulgaria and Russia.

Some modern Romanian theologians published studies about Saint Parascheva: Pr. Gh. Păvăloiu (1935), Arhim. Varahil Jitaru (1942), D. Stănescu (1938), Pr. M. Țesan (1955), Pr. Scarlat Porcescu, Pr. Prof. Mircea Păcurariu.

Relics
In subsequent years, Paraskevi’s relics were transferred to various churches in the region.

In 1238, the relics were transferred from Kallikrateia to Veliko Tarnovo, capital of the Second Bulgarian Empire.

In 1393, they were transferred to Belgrade, specifically the Ružica Church.  When Belgrade fell to Ottoman forces in 1521, the relics were transferred to Constantinople.  In 1641, the relics were transferred to Trei Ierarhi Monastery, in Iaşi, Moldavia (nowadays, eastern part of Romania).  In 1888, they were transferred to the Metropolitan Cathedral of Iaşi.

A severe drought in 1946-47 affected Moldavia, adding to the misery left by the war. Metropolitan Justinian Marina permitted the first procession featuring the coffin containing the relics of Saint Paraskevi, kept at Iaşi since then. The relics wended their way through the drought-deserted villages of Iaşi, Vaslui, Roman, Bacău, Putna, Neamţ, Baia and Botoşani Counties. The offerings collected on this occasion were distributed, based on Metropolitan Justinian's decisions, to orphans, widows, invalids, school cafeterias, churches under construction, and to monasteries in order to feed the sick, and old or feeble monks.

Iași pilgrimage
Pilgrimage at the shrines located in the Metropolitan Cathedral of Iași has become one of the major religious events in Romania. Hundreds of thousands of pilgrims gather each year in Iași in the second weekend of October to commemorate St. Parascheva, while the city itself established its Celebration Days at the same time.

Dedicated churches

Worldwide, there are many churches named in honor of or dedicated to Paraskeva. Some of the more notable include:
Metropolitan Cathedral, Iași, Romania
Church of St Paraskeva, Nesebar, Bulgaria
Church of St Petka of the Saddlers, Sofia, Bulgaria
Church of St Petka, Vukovo, Bulgaria
Church of Saint Parascheva, Slabinja, Croatia
St. Petka's Church, Banovci, Croatia

Notes

References

11th-century Christian saints
Byzantine female saints
Byzantine saints of the Eastern Orthodox Church
Angelic visionaries
Marian visionaries
Miracle workers
11th-century women
Byzantine saints
People from Silivri